Iain Ballamy (born 20 February 1964) is a British composer and saxophonist. He is considered one of the greatest modern jazz saxophonists.

Career
Ballamy was born in Guildford, Surrey, and educated at George Abbot School, Guildford, from 1975 to 1980. He then studied Musical Instrument Technology from 1980 to 1982 at Merton College. He took piano lessons from age of 6 to 14.

He discovered saxophone in 1978 with three lessons and his first professional gig was in 1980. He played Ronnie Scotts as Iain Ballamy Quartet at age 20. He was a founding member of Loose Tubes in 1984. First recording with Billy Jenkins in 1985, his first solo album, Balloon Man, was released in 1988. One of his closest musical collaborators is Django Bates.

During his career he has performed or recorded with a wide range of musicians including Gil Evans, Hermeto Pascoal, New York Composers Orchestra, Carla Bley, Dewey Redman, George Coleman, London Sinfonietta, Françios Jeanneau, Daniel Humair, Mike Gibbs, Randy Weston, Karnataka College of Percussion, Sax Assault, Jazz Train, Freebop, Nishat Khan, R.A.Ramamani, T.A.S. Mani, Clare Martin, Human Chain, Dr. L. Subramaniam, Tom Robinson, Charlie Watts Orchestra, Jeremy Stacey, Randy Weston, Joanna MacGregor, Delightful Precipice, Bill Bruford, Django Bates, Mark Wingfield, Jane Chapman, Bryan Ferry, Everything But The Girl, Food, Food for Quartet, Loose Tubes, Oxcentrics, Ian Shaw, Slim Gaillard, Ultramarine (band), Ashley Slater, Hungry Ants, Ronnie Scott, Gordon Beck, Britten Sinfonia, and Gay Dad.

In 1999, Ballamy founded the record label Feral Records, in partnership with graphic artist and filmmaker Dave McKean. In 2005, he composed the musical score for the movie MirrorMask. He also composed the score for Luna, which is also directed by McKean.

Ballamy is a visiting currently a professor at the Royal Academy of Music, Birmingham Conservatoire, Trinity College of Music, and the Royal Welsh College of Music & Drama.

Discography

As leader
 Balloon Man (1988)
 All Men Amen (1995)
 Acme (1995)
 Pepper Street Interludes (2000) with Stian Carstensen, Norma Winstone, Martin France and Matthew Sharpe
 Signal To Noise (2000), BBC Radio 3 Play Adaptation of the graphic novel by Neil Gaiman and Dave McKean
 Veggie (2002) with Thomas Strønen, Arve Henriksen and Mats Eilertsen
 The Little Radio (2004) with Stian Carstensen
 Molecular Gastronomy (2007) with Thomas Strønen
 MirrorMask (Original Motion Picture Soundtrack) (2005)
 Anorak (2007)

As co-leader
With Food (Ballamy & Thomas Strønen)
 Food  (1996) – Food with Arve Henriksen and Mats Eilertsen
 Organic and GM Food (2001) with Arve Henriksen and Mats Eilertsen
 Veggie (2002) with Arve Henriksen and Mats Eilertsen
 Last Supper (2004, Rune Grammofon) with Arve Henriksen and Mats Eilertsen
 Molecular Gastronomy (2007, Rune Grammofon) – Duo: Iain Ballamy & Thomas Strønen, feat. Maria Kannegaard & Ashley Slater
 Quiet Inlet (2010, ECM Records) with Nils Petter Molvaer and Christian Fennesz
 Mercurial Balm (2012, ECM Records) with Christian Fennesz, Eivind Aarset, Prakash Sontakke and Nils Petter Molvaer
This Is Not a Miracle (ECM, 2013 [2015])

With Quercus (trio including June Tabor and Huw Warren)
 Quercus (2013, ECM Records)
 Nightfall (2017, ECM Records)

As sideman
With Loose Tubes
 Loose Tubes (1985)
 Delightful Precipice (1986)
 Open Letter (1988)
 JazzBühne Berlin'87 Vol.16 Loose Tubes

With Billy Jenkins
 Greenwich (1985)
 Uncommerciality Vol 1 (1986)
 Scratches of Spain (1987)
 Motorway At Night (1988)
 Jazz Cafe Concerts Vol 1 (1989)
 Jazz Cafe Concerts Vol 2 (1989)
True Love Collection (1999)
First Aural Art Exhibition (2006)

With Bill Bruford's Earthworks
 Earthworks (1987)
 Dig? (1989)
 All Heaven Broke Loose (1991)
 Stamping Ground (1994)
 Heavenly Bodies (1997)

With Django Bates
 Summer Fruits (and Unrest) (JMT, 1993)
 Winter Truce (and Homes Blaze) (JMT, 1995)
 Good Evening...Here is the News (1995)
 Like Life (1997)
 Quiet Nights (1998)
 You Live and Learn...(Apparently) (2004)

With Ian Shaw
 Ghostsongs
 Taking it to Hart
 Famous Rainy Day
 In a New York Minute

With Ray Russell
 Childscape (1987)
 A Table Near The Band
 At Montreux Jazz Festival

With others
Dominic Alldis, Themes From French Cinema (2004)
 Mike Gibbs – By The Way
 Clarke Tracey – Stability
 The Hungry Ants, Hungry Ants
 John Donaldson, Ray Drummond and Victor Lewis – Meeting in Brooklyn
 Claire Martin – Devil May Care
 Linda Sharrock – Like A River,
 Mo Foster – Southern Reunion,
 John Stevens – Blue
 Tom Robinson – Hope and Glory
 Malaya Marutha – Span the Globe
 Sax Assault – BANG
 Michiel Braam – Playing the Second Coolbook
 Dave McKean and Neil Gaiman – BV Haast
 Louis Vidal – Vermeer
 Iva Bittova – Plaza
 Mark Wingfield and Jane Chapman – Three Windows
 Eric Starr She (2003) Such is Life (2015)

Commissions
 1995 Estuary English – Apollo Saxophone Quartet
 1996 Mirror Signal Manouvre – Apollo Saxophone Quartet
 1996 ACME – Commissioned by Birmingham Jazz
 1997 Oblique – Commissioned by SAMPAD/Birmingham Jazz
 1998 Four and a half minutes late Jane Chapman, Solo Harpsichord
 1998 Walpurgis Night Joanna MacGregor – Duet for Piano & Tenor Sax

Awards
 1985 John Dankworth Cup, Best Soloist.
 1995 BT British Jazz Award, Best Ensemble – Balloon Man.
 2001 BBC Jazz Award for Innovation.

Group history
 Balloon Man 1983 – 1993
 Loose Tubes 1984 – 1990
 Billy Jenkins Voice of God 1985 to date
 Bill Bruford’s Earthworks 1986 – 1992
 Django Bates’ Human Chain and Delightful Precipice 1992 to date
 Iain Ballamy's ACME 1996 to date
 Food For Quartet 1997 to date
 Anorak 2001 to date
 The Little Radio 2003 to date

British Council tours
Romania 1985, Morocco 1995, China 1997, Senegal 1997, India 1996 and 1998, Lithuania 1998, and Colombia 1998.

Television
Jazz 606, Meltdown, The Tube, Bergerac, Illuminations, Stay Lucky, Right to Reply, Wogan, and Ronnie Corbett Show.

Radio
 "Cashier Number 6 Please"  Documentary exploring the world of the ubiquitous automated voice – on railway stations, in the post office, on the phone and even around the home. With the music of Iain Ballamy & Ashley Slater. Inc interviews. 23/05/2005
Jazz on 3. Iain Ballamy and Stian Carstensen in session. 06/02/2004
Late Junction. Iain Ballamy and Stian Carstensen play live in the studio. Radio Three 6/2/2004.
Jazz Record Requests. Listeners' requests performed by Iain Ballamy, John Parricelli, Tim Harries and Ian Thomas. Live from the London Jazz Festival.
Front Row. White Horses TV theme by Jackie Lee and its enduring appeal since 1968 discussed by Iain Ballamy, with clip [3.40] Date: 04/09/2003
Between the Ears. Iain Ballamy improvises on the Drake song "It Was a Very Good Year". 29.12.02
Jazz on 3. Howard Riley and Iain Ballamy duo. 1.11.02
Jazz on 3. Iain Ballamy plays original compositions with his group Cob at Ronnie Scott's 21.12.01
Jazz on 3. Norma Winstone performs with John Parricelli and Iain Ballamy. 4.3.00
Jazz Notes. London Jazz Festival set by Ian Shaw, Cedar Walton, Iain Ballamy, Mark Hodgson and Mark Fletcher. 25.1.00
Jazz on 3. Iain Ballamy's Food for Quartet – a new Anglo-Norwegian collaboration between Iain Ballamy, Thomas Stronen, Mats Eilerstein and Arve Henriksen. Recorded at the Cheltenham Jazz Festival.
 Signal to Noise, Dave McKean and Neil Gaiman, R4, 1997.
Impressions. Iain Ballamy discusses his various projects and performs with his group Hungry Ants, with Richard Fairhust, Steve Watts and Tim Giles. 20.1.96
"Jazz at the Bath Festival". Human Chain (Django Bates, Iain Ballamy, Stuart Hall, Martin France) with Joanna MacGregor. BBC Radio 3 10.7.93
Straight Face. Group led by Mick Hutton featuring Claire Martin, Iain Ballamy, Nikki Iles and Steve Arguelles. BBC Radio 3 27.2.93

Film sessions
 My Son the Fanatic
 Joseph Losey: The Man with Four Names
 Absolute Beginners
 The Last Days of General Patton
 MirrorMask

Dance
2003 – 2004 Dance Ranjabiati Sircar/SAMPAD, SANKALPAM.

Theatre
Out There, Riverside Studios

References

External links
Iain Ballamy's homepage
Iain Ballamy's MySpace page
Biography at Jazzcds
Biography at Babel

Interviews
Interview at BBC Music/Jazz
Interview with Iain Ballamy at Innerviews
Interview with Iain Ballamy in Jazzwise Magazine

Reviews
Review of Veggie, The Guardian 11 October 2002
Review of Veggie at All About Jazz
Review of The Little Radio, The Guardian 6 February 2004
Review of Little Radio, BBC Music/Jazz

Articles

 Balancing act, The Times 07/10/1989
 Sax men find solutions, The Sunday Times 08/10/1989
Review of Organic and GM Food at All About Jazz

1964 births
Living people
English jazz saxophonists
British male saxophonists
English jazz composers
Male jazz composers
English male composers
Jazz tenor saxophonists
Jazz alto saxophonists
Jazz soprano saxophonists
Academics of the Royal Welsh College of Music & Drama
People from Guildford
E.G. Records artists
21st-century saxophonists
21st-century British male musicians
Loose Tubes members
Earthworks (band) members
Delightful Precipice members
Human Chain members
Voice of God Collective members
Rune Grammofon artists
La-La Land Records artists
Basho Records artists